In the Russian Federation, a city of federal importance, also known as a federal city, is a city that has a status of both an inhabited locality and a constituent federal subject. Russia claims three federal cities - Moscow, Saint Petersburg and Sevastopol.

Moscow and Saint Petersburg are the largest cities in the country: Moscow is the national capital and Saint Petersburg is a previous Russian capital and important port city in the Baltic Sea. Sevastopol is located in Crimea and is the site of Sevastopol Naval Base, the home port of the Russian Black Sea Fleet.

Notes

References

 
Federal subjects of Russia